Cyril Martin (13 September 1928 – 29 September 2007) was a South African wrestler. He competed in the men's freestyle welterweight at the 1952 Summer Olympics.

References

External links
 

1928 births
2007 deaths
South African male sport wrestlers
Olympic wrestlers of South Africa
Wrestlers at the 1952 Summer Olympics
Place of birth missing